The Anuario de Historia de la Iglesia (Yearbook of the History of the Church) is an annual open access academic journal published by the Institute of the History of the Church (Faculty of Theology, University of Navarra). It was established in 1992 and covers ecclesiastical history, religious history, theological history, and the history of art. Its founding editor-in-chief was Josep-Ignasi Saranyana, the current editor is  Santiago Casas. Publishing formats are Studies, Historiography and bibliography, Conversations, Chronicles, and Reviews.

Abstracting and indexing 
The journal is abstracted and indexed in:
 Latindex
 Arts & Humanities Citation Index
 Catholic Periodical and Literature Index
 Academic Search Complete
 L'Année Philologique
 Redalyc
 Scopus

External links 
 

1992 establishments in Spain
Religion history journals
Spanish-language journals
Publications established in 1992
University of Navarra